Elisabeth premetro station is a premetro station in Antwerp, Belgium. Located under the intersection of the Sint-Elisabethstraat with the Greinstraat and the Delinstraat, it is served by lines 2, 3, 5 and 6.

Elisabeth premetro station has only one entrance that leads to level -1. The ticket hall is on level -1, while on level -2 are both platforms, each 60 meters, in front of each other.

In 1996 only line 3 served this premetro station. Line 5 was added in 2006; line 6, in 2007; and line 2, in 2012.

See also
 Trams in Antwerp

Antwerp Premetro
Railway stations opened in 1996
1996 establishments in Belgium